The Felton Presbyterian Church (Historical Building) is a former public library and church building in Felton, California. It was located in a historic building at 6299 Gushee Street, built in 1893, known formerly as Felton Presbyterian Church. The building is listed on the National Register of Historic Places under its former name.

History 
The building was listed on the National Register in 1978.

The building was used as the Felton Public Library from 1956 to 2019. The new Felton Public Library building, next to the Felton post office on Gushee Street, was scheduled to open in February 2020.

See also 
Felton Presbyterian Church, current church, located at 6090 Highway 9, three-tenths of a mile away

References

Churches completed in 1893
19th-century Presbyterian church buildings in the United States
Churches on the National Register of Historic Places in California
Presbyterian churches in California
Buildings and structures in Santa Cruz County, California
National Register of Historic Places in Santa Cruz County, California